Aricia can refer to:

Aricia (butterfly), a genus of butterflies
Aricia (Celtic), historical figure in ancient Britain
Aricia (mythology), a minor figure in Greek mythology
Aricia, Italy
Hippolytus and Aricia, an opera by Jean-Philippe Rameau
MV Aricia, an Okanagan Lake ferry